This is a list of films based on poems.  

 Padmaavat (2018, India)
 The Adventure of Sudsakorn (1979, Thailand)
 Arabian Nights (1974, Pasolini) (Abu Nuwas)
 Aniara (2018, Sweden)
 Ashik Kerib (1988, USSR)
 Beowulf (1999, USA)
 Beowulf (2007, USA)
 Beowulf & Grendel (2005, Iceland, United Kingdom, Canada)
 Braveheart (1995, USA), from The Actes and Deidis of the Illustre and Vallyeant Campioun Schir William Wallace, by Blind Harry
 Bright Star (2009, UK/Aus/France), named in reference to a sonnet by John Keats
 Casey at the Bat (1927, USA)
 The Castilian (1963, Spanish) from the Poema de Fernán González
 The Charge of the Light Brigade (1912, USA)
 The Charge of the Light Brigade (1936, USA, Errol Flynn, Olivia de Havilland, David Niven)
 The Charge of the Light Brigade (1968, UK, Trevor Howard, John Gieigud, Vanessa Redgrave)
 The Color of Pomegranates (1969, Armenian SSR)
 El Cid (1961, USA, Spain, Charlton Heston)
 The Full Monteverdi (2007, UK), based on Italian Renaissance poems by Giovanni Battista Guarini, Ottavio Rinuccini and Torquato Tasso, among others, set to music by Claudio Monteverdi.
 The Green Knight (2021, USA)
 Grendel Grendel Grendel (1981, Australia)
 Gunga Din (1939, United States)
 The Hangman (1964, USA, short)
 Helen of Troy (1956, USA/Italy)
 Hiawatha (1913, USA) based on the narrative poem The Song of Hiawatha by Henry Wadsworth Longfellow
 Hiawatha (1952, USA) same source as above
 Howl (2010, USA) based on the Allen Ginsberg's poem and events surrounding its publication. 
 How the Grinch Stole Christmas (2000, USA)
 The Humpbacked Horse (1947, USSR)
 The Humpbacked Horse (1976, USSR)
 Il Postino: The Postman (1994, Italy) inspired by the poetry of Pablo Neruda
 L'Invitation au voyage (film) (1927, France)
 Jabberwocky (1977, UK)
 Jackanory: The Story of Beowulf (1966, UK, serial) 
  Kytice (Wild Flowers) (2000, Czech Republic)
 The Man from Snowy River (1982, Australia)
 The Man from Snowy River II (US title: "Return to Snowy River" — UK title: "The Untamed") (1988, Australia)
 Melody Time (1948, USA) featuring "Trees", from the 1913 poem by Joyce Kilmer
 The Monkey's Mask (2000, Australia)
 Mulan (1998, USA)
 My Heart Is Mine Alone (1997, Germany)
 Die Nibelungen (1924, Germany) based on the epic poem Nibelungenlied written around AD 1200
 Die Nibelungen (1966–67, Germany) same source as above
 The Night Before Christmas (1941, USA, short) 
 The Night Before Christmas: A Mouse Tale (2002, United States, short, made-for-TV) 
 The Nightmare Before Christmas (1993, United States)
 O Brother, Where Art Thou? (2000, United States), loosely based on The Odyssey
 Paterson (2016, United States), inspired by Paterson by William Carlos Williams
 The Pied Piper of Hamelin (1957, United States), loosely based on The Pied Piper of Hamelin by Robert Browning
 Pumpkinhead (1988, United States), loosely based on Pumpkinhead by Ed Justin
 Ramanan (1967, India)
 The Raven (1963, United States) based on references to The Raven by Edgar Allan Poe
 The Sentimental Bloke (1919, Australia) based on the poem The Songs of a Sentimental Bloke by C. J. Dennis
 The Set-Up (1949, United States) based on the narrative poem The Set-Up by Joseph Moncure March
 The Shooting of Dan McGrew (1924, United States)
 The Tale of the Priest and of His Workman Balda (1933-1936, USSR)
 Tale of Tales (1979, USSR) named after the poem Tale of Tales by Nazım Hikmet, but based on the Russian lullaby Bayu Bayushki Bayu 
 The Tale of Tsar Saltan (1984, USSR) based on the poem The Tale of Tsar Saltan, of His Son the Renowned and Mighty Bogatyr Prince Gvidon Saltanovich, and of the Beautiful Princess-Swan by Aleksandr Pushkin
 Taniel (2018, UK and Armenia) based on Armenian poet Taniel Varoujan's poems 
 Troy (2004, United States), from the poem The Iliad by Homer
 Ulysses (1954, Italy) based on the epic poem Odyssey by Homer
 Under Milk Wood (1972, United Kingdom) based on Under Milk Wood by Dylan Thomas
 The Vampire (1913, USA) from the eponymous 1897 poem by Rudyard Kipling
 War-Gods of the Deep (1965, USA) based on the 1845 poem "The City in the Sea" by Edgar Allan Poe
 The White Cliffs of Dover (1944, United States) based on the poem The White Cliffs by Alice Duer Miller with additional poetry by screenwriter Robert Nathan. 
 The Wind Will Carry Us (1999, Iran) is titled after the poem The Wind Will Carry Us by Forough Farrokhzad, and the film references the ideas of life and death in the poem Rubaiyat of Omar Khayyam by Omar Khayyám and Farrokhzad's.
 Winter Days (2003, Japan)

See also
 Lists of film source material
 List of films based on Greco-Roman mythology

 
Poems